A Russian doll (or Matryoshka) is a type of nested, wooden toy.

Russian Doll or Russian Dolls may also refer to:

Television series
 Russian Doll (TV series), a 2019 American drama series on Netflix
 Russian Dolls (2011 TV series), a 2011 American reality series on Lifetime
 Russian Dolls: Sex Trade, a 2005 Flemish drama series

Other uses
 Russian Doll (film), a 2001 Australian comedy film
 Russian Dolls (film), a 2006 French-British comedy-drama film
 "Russian Dolls", a song from Nicolas Jaar's EP Russian Dolls

See also
 Matryoshka (disambiguation)